Phityogamasus is a genus of mites in the family Parasitidae.

Species
 Phityogamasus primitivus (Oudemans, 1904)

References

Parasitidae